Margh (also Romanized as Morgh and Marq) is a village in Baqeran Rural District, in the Central District of Birjand County, South Khorasan Province, Iran. At the 2016 census, its population was 49, in 17 families.

References 

Populated places in Birjand County